Multiple minute digitate hyperkeratosis (also known as "Digitate keratoses," "Disseminated spiked hyperkeratosis," "Familial disseminated piliform hyperkeratosis," and "Minute aggregate keratosis") is a rare cutaneous condition, with about half of cases being familial, inherited in an autosomal dominant fashion, while the other half are sporadic.

This disease has a unique histology, so a biopsy and further tests should be done to confirm the diagnosis and rule out other disorders and malignancy.

See also
 Epidermis
 Skin lesion

References

Epidermal nevi, neoplasms, and cysts